The 1994 Australian Formula Ford Championship was a CAMS sanctioned motor racing title for drivers of Formula Ford racing cars. It was the 25th national series for Formula Fords to be held in Australia and 2nd to carry the Australian Formula Ford Championship name.

1994 saw the series debut of young Queanbeyan driver and future multiple Formula One Grand Prix winner Mark Webber. Driving an ex-Craig Lowndes Van Diemen RF93 his father had purchased for him, Webber finished 14th in the series.

Steven Richards, the son of multiple Bathurst and Australian Touring Car Champion Jim Richards, dominated the series winning six of the eight rounds in his Valvoline sponsored Van Diemen. Finishing second (also in a Van Diemen) was Gavin Monaghan, with Jason Bright finishing third in his Swift SC93F.

Van Diemen was easily the most popular chassis in the series with over 20 appearing on the grids. Swift Racing Cars supplied seven cars, while the lone Reynard in the field was driven by another future Bathurst winner, Jason Bargwanna.

Calendar
The championship was contested over an eight-round series with two races per round.
 Round 1, Amaroo Park, New South Wales, 27 February
 Round 2, Sandown, Victoria, 6 March
 Round 3, Phillip Island, Victoria, 10 April
 Round 4, Lakeside, Queensland, 24 April
 Round 5, Winton, Victoria, 15 May
 Round 6, Mallala, South Australia, 26 June
 Round 7, Barbagallo Raceway, Western Australia, 3 July
 Round 8, Oran Park, New South Wales, 24 July

Results

References

Further reading
 Phil Branagan, Richards the Lionheart, Australian Motor Racing Year, 1994/95, pages 188-193

Australian Formula Ford Championship seasons
Formula Ford Championship